Major General Robert John Thomson,  (born 1 January 1967) is a former senior British Army officer. He served as Commander of British Forces Cyprus between September 2019 and August 2022.

Military career
He was educated at Brentwood School, Essex, Magdalene College, Cambridge and King's College London (MA Defence Studies). Thomson was commissioned into the Royal Green Jackets on 2 September 1988. He served as commanding officer of 2nd Battalion The Rifles and was deployed in that role on Operation Herrick 10 in Afghanistan from May 2009 to October 2009. He went on to be commander of 38th (Irish) Brigade in December 2011 and Deputy Commander of Regional Command Southwest in April 2014, in which role he led the withdrawal of British troops from Camp Bastion in October 2014. He became British defence attaché in Paris in September 2017, and commander of British Forces Cyprus in September 2019.

Thomson was appointed a Member of the Order of the British Empire in the 2005 New Year Honours, and advanced to Commander of the Order of the British Empire for services in Afghanistan on 3 July 2015.

References

 

1967 births
Living people
People educated at Brentwood School, Essex
Alumni of Magdalene College, Cambridge
Alumni of King's College London
British Army generals
British Army personnel of the Iraq War
British Army personnel of the War in Afghanistan (2001–2021)
Commanders of the Order of the British Empire
Companions of the Distinguished Service Order